A Lambeg drum is a large drum, beaten with curved malacca canes. It is used primarily in Northern Ireland by Unionists and the Orange Order traditionally in street parades held in the summer, particularly on and around 12 July ("The Twelfth"). The weight of the drum means that it had been replaced with smaller replicas for most parades, but the full-sized instrument has started to reappear in recent years - usually on floats. It is also used by the Ancient Order of Hibernians, having historical significance for parts of the nationalist community, as well.

Characteristics
The Lambeg drum is, together with the bagpipe, one of the loudest acoustic instruments in the world, frequently reaching over 120 dB. Usually it is carried by the drummer while marching, using a neck harness.

Origin
The origin of the Lambeg is unclear. It is commonly believed to have come to Ulster with English settlers in the early-mid-17th century. Other accounts state it came to Ireland with the Duke of Schomberg's men of the army of William of Orange during the Williamite war. Having its roots in the 17th century European military instruments it was originally smaller. Traditionally it was accompanied by the shrill fife, a small transverse flute similar to the piccolo. Over time, the drum grew in size through emulousness between players. The drum eventually got to such a scale that the fifes were drowned out. Today the fife and Lambeg together are the exception rather than the norm in parades; the combination is most common in County Antrim. Most of the original Ulster fifers were of Flemish descent. A number of French Huguenots had followed William's army into Ireland and the Flemish, English and Scottish Protestant groups had united into the Orange Order.

The name comes from the village of Lambeg, County Antrim, which is situated ten miles southwest of Belfast and two miles from Lisburn. Tradition has it, that it was in the Lambeg area that the instrument was first played with canes. The drum is sometimes also called "tibbies", "slashers", or "killymans".

Construction
The Lambeg drum's shell is generally made of oak. Lambeg drum heads are goat skins, they are very thin and strong, and of even thickness and consistency all over as far as possible. A Lambeg skin will also receive "special" treatment that is a secret to each maker. Because of their qualities they are also sometimes used for smaller drums such as bodhráns.

The Lambegs are different from other large drums in the quality of their tone. The thin heads are pulled tighter and tighter until the tone is bright and hard. There are no mechanical screws on the drums. The heads are held on with a wooden rim and, traditionally, linen ropes.

References

External links
Different Drums (Northern Irish group that uniquely combine the drums of both communities)
"The Tradition of the Lambeg Drum in Ireland"
"Lambeg Drum" by Paul Marshall, from Drum Dojo site
Video clips of Lambeg drums 
Video clips of the Ulster-Scots eXperience playing Lambeg drums 
"Luton and Bedford Lambeg Drumming Club, England"
Drumming match at Slatt, Ballymena
Ulster-Scots Agency feature on Lambeg Drum 

Drums
Battle drums
Culture of Northern Ireland
Irish musical instruments